Arvīds Bārda (24 November 1901 – 11 November 1940) was a Latvian footballer, brother of Edvīns Bārda, Rūdolfs Bārda and Oskars Bārda. He was born and died in Riga.

Biography
Bārda started his football career in 1921 when he along with his brothers joined JKS Riga - the strongest Latvian football club at the time, he played with the side in 1921 and 1922. In early 1923 Bārda joined the newly founded RFK - the leader in Latvian football in the years to follow. Along with his brother Edvīns he was selected to play in the first ever international match for Latvia on 24 September 1922. In total between 1922 and 1924 Arvīds played seven international matches for Latvia scoring two goals. He was a member of Latvia football team at the 1924 Summer Olympics.

Bārda played with RFK from 1923 to 1926 winning three Latvian league titles. After retiring from playing he continued to participate in football matches as a referee.

In 1933 Bārda participated in a match of club veterans against the RFK youth squad to celebrate the 10th anniversary of RFK.

References

External links
 

1901 births
1940 deaths
Footballers from Riga
People from Kreis Riga
Latvian footballers
Latvia international footballers
Footballers at the 1924 Summer Olympics
Olympic footballers of Latvia
Association football forwards